Phyllangia americana is a reef coral species from the family Caryophylliidae. The scientific name of the species was first published in 1849 by Milne-Edwards & Haime.

References

External links

Caryophylliidae
Fauna of the Caribbean
Biota of the Gulf of Mexico